Clarence E. Mathias (December 12, 1876 – December 9, 1935) was an American Sergeant Major serving in the United States Marine Corps during the Boxer Rebellion who received the Medal of Honor for bravery.

Biography
Mathias was born December 12, 1876, in Royalton, Pennsylvania, and after entering the Marine Corps he was sent as a private to China to fight in the Boxer Rebellion.

He died December 9, 1935, and is buried in Arlington National Cemetery, Arlington, Virginia. His grave can be found in section 6, lot 8681, map grid W/22.

Medal of Honor citation
Rank and organization: Private, U.S. Marine Corps. Born: 12 December 1876, Royalton, Pa. Accredited to: Pennsylvania. G.O. No.: 55, 19 July 1901.

Citation:

In the presence of the enemy during the advance on Tientsin, China, 13 July 1900, Mathias distinguished himself by meritorious conduct.

See also

 List of Medal of Honor recipients
 List of Medal of Honor recipients for the Boxer Rebellion

References

External links
 
 

1876 births
1935 deaths
United States Marine Corps Medal of Honor recipients
United States Marines
American military personnel of the Boxer Rebellion
People from Dauphin County, Pennsylvania
Burials at Arlington National Cemetery
Boxer Rebellion recipients of the Medal of Honor